State Highway 45 is a highway loop around Austin, Texas, that exists in two open segments.

One segment is in southwest Austin and runs southeast from Ranch to Market Road 1826 to Farm to Market Road 1626 and intersects the southern terminus of Loop 1 (Mopac Expressway). Between RM 1826 and Loop 1, the roadway is a divided, four-lane facility with a wide median intended to accommodate a future freeway, after which the current lanes would serve as frontage roads. Between Loop 1 and FM 1626, the roadway becomes a tolled freeway.

The other segment is a toll road that forms a backwards C-shape along the boundary of Travis and Williamson County before bending down along the eastern edge of the Austin metropolitan area where it shares its route with SH-130.

Route description
Before the 2002 Central Texas Turnpike Project (CTTP), SH 45 existed only as a short section of four-lane, divided highway in southwest Austin. The CTTP added a toll road that runs east from US 183 near Cedar Park, crosses I-35, bi-secting the La Frontera development, and meets SH 130 near Pflugerville. South of this interchange, SH 45 is co-signed with SH 130 to US 183 just south of Austin-Bergstrom International Airport. SH 45 then loops westward rejoining I-35 north of Buda.

SH 45 North
SH 45 North is an approximately  segment in the north Austin metropolitan area. The freeway's western terminus is at US 183 northwest of Austin in Cedar Park. For a distance, RM 620 travels concurrently with the frontage roads also designated as State Highway 45 (non-tolled). Heading east, the freeway intercepts Loop 1's northern terminus, bisects La Frontera and crosses I-35. This particular segment ends at SH 130 near Pflugerville, but the SH 45 designation continues southward along SH 130.

The Texas Department of Transportation had originally planned to complete construction of the entire 2002 CTTP in September 2007 but opened some sections of SH 45 North as early as October 31, 2006.

SH 45 Southeast
Roughly paralleling Farm to Market Road 1327, it is a four-lane, controlled-access facility that links SH 130 and US 183 to Interstate 35 north of Buda, Texas. It completes the SH 45 eastern bypass loop around the Austin metropolitan area.

Originally planned as part of the 2002 CTTP, SH 45 Southeast became the subject of controversy, delaying development and necessitating it as a separate project. In 2006, an environmental advocacy group filed a lawsuit in an effort to move the alignment further south. By the summer of the same year, the Federal Highway Administration approved a new environmental impact study affirming the existing alignment, and a federal judge dismissed the case, clearing the way for construction, which began in Summer 2007. SH 45 Southeast was opened to traffic on May 7, 2009.

SH 45 Southwest
SH 45 Southwest is a  tollway link between the southern terminus of Loop 1 in the west and Farm to Market Road 1626 to the east. It is a four-lane, controlled-access facility and has a toll rate of $1. Construction on the SH 45 Southwest link officially began in November 2016, after decades of delays due to environmental and legislative concerns.  SH 45 Southwest was opened to traffic on June 1, 2019. On April 25th, 2022, the highway was assigned a speed limit 70 miles per hour. From the opening of the highway until that date, the highway had no signed speed limit. The unsigned speed limit was set at the state default of 65 miles per hour, as the CTRMA conducted studies to find the 85th percentile operating speed.

The highway will still require a segment between FM 1626 and I-35 to connect to the other tolled segments of SH 45. This section, SH 45 South, is already included in the Capital Area Metropolitan Planning Organization (CAMPO) 2040 Plan for study. This missing link was one source of controversy surrounding the alignment of SH 45 Southeast. Opponents claimed the proximity of the southwestern and southeastern sections would create more pressure to connect the two and that, if built, the link would encourage development on or near environmentally sensitive land. Planning for the western portions of SH 45 to form a complete loop is still very early, although a proposal for possible route has already been offered by the City of Lakeway.

History
 State Highway 45 was originally designated on August 18, 1919, as a route from Bryan to Louisiana border. On September 17, 1923, the section west of Roans Prairie was cancelled. On August 11, 1925, SH 45 was rerouted through Point Blank, Coldspring and Shepherd. On March 19, 1929, a branch of SH 45 on a more direct route from Point Blank to Livingston was designated. As of March 19, 1930, large portions of the highway were still under construction along the proposed route. The section of the branch from Point Blank to Coldspring was renumbered as SH 156 and the section of the branch from Coldspring to Shepherd was renumbered as part of SH 150, so that SH 45 went on the most direct route between Point Blank and Livingston. By 1938, the road was complete, with small portions remaining as a dirt road. On September 26, 1939, the highway from Huntsville to Jasper had been transferred to U.S. Highway 190, the stretch from Jasper to the Louisiana border transferred to SH 63, and the section from Roan's Prairie to Huntsville redirected north to Crockett. on August 24, 1960, the stretch from Huntsville to Crockett was transferred to SH 19. On December 15, 1960, the rest of SH 45 was canceled and transferred to SH 30 to avoid confusion with I-45. The current route was designated, but not constructed, on May 22, 1985, as a proposed Austin Loop, along with SH 130 (north of US 183 only).
SH 45A was a spur designated on September 14, 1926, from Coldspring west to New Waverly. On March 19, 1930, this spur was renumbered as SH 150.

On February 11, 2021, icy conditions caused a 26 vehicle pile-up. This incident occurred near the overpass with RM 620. Three people were hospitalized.

The interchange at I-35 was partially affected by the March 21, 2022 tornado outbreak when a large light pole was ripped off its foundation, the debris resting on the side of a flyover, as seen from photos captured by KXAN-TV.

Exit list

References

Further reading

Wear, Ben. Fifth toll road clears legal hurdles. Austin American-Statesman, accessed December 14, 2006.

External links

 
 TxTag: Austin Area Toll Roads
 SH 45 Southwest

045
045
Transportation in Austin, Texas
Transportation in Williamson County, Texas
Transportation in Travis County, Texas
Beltways in the United States
Transportation in Hays County, Texas